The Rutgers School of Public Health (SPH) is part of Rutgers Biomedical and Health Sciences. Prior to July 1, 2013, it was affiliated with the now-defunct University of Medicine and Dentistry of New Jersey. The School of Public Health educates students to become leaders in public health, researchers, and promoters of population and individual health.

References

External links
 School of Public Health

Rutgers University colleges and schools
Education in Newark, New Jersey
Educational institutions established in 1983
Universities and colleges in Essex County, New Jersey
1983 establishments in New Jersey